Rosina Randafiarison (born 29 December 1999) is a weightlifter from Madagascar. She won gold medals at the 5th International Solidarity Championships in 2018, the 2019 African Weightlifting Championships, the 2019 African Games and the 2019 African Junior Championships.

Her snatch and total lifts at the 2019 African Championship were recognised as Junior Women's African Records.

The last opportunity for Madagascar to ensure the qualification of its weightlifters for the Tokyo Olympics was at the African Championship Zone 3 (South Zone for juniors) event in November 2019. Jean Alex Harinelina Randriamanarivo, the President of the Madagascan weightlifting Federation (Fédération Malgache d’Haltérophilie, de musculation et culturisme) identified Randafiarison as a key part of the team. At the 2019 African Games, Randafiarison won the gold.

Randafiarison won a total of 16 continental and regional gold medals in 2019.

Notes

References

External links
newsmada.com interview (in French)

1999 births
Living people
Malagasy female weightlifters
African Games medalists in weightlifting
African Games gold medalists for Madagascar
Competitors at the 2019 African Games
African Weightlifting Championships medalists
21st-century Malagasy people